Diplodus cervinus, the zebra sea bream, is a species of seabream belonging to the family Sparidae.

Description
The zebra seabream has a high compressed laterally body with a pointed snout and thick lips. It is a medium-sized fish which can reach a maximum length of 55 cm, with an average length of 35 cm.
Its background color is silvered with dark vertical bands, the first five ones run across the body from the caudal peduncle to the pectoral fins level, another characteristic dark band cross the space between the eyes while crossing them.

Distribution & habitat
Diplodus cervinus is found in eastern Atlantic Ocean from Gulf of Biscay to South Africa and also in Mediterranean Sea. 
Youth, it prefers shallow and quiet living areas like rocks, piers and grass beds. Adult, it usually lives rocky slopes and wrecks.

Biology
According to the fishing pressure which undergoes on the zebra seabream living area, it has a solitary or gregarious behaviour.
The zebra seabream is carnivorous and its diet consist mainly in benthic food like sea urchins, worms and bivalve molluscs.

Overfishing
Diplodus cervinus has many threats to its population. One of the threats is being overfished. The abundance has been reduced by 85% of the unexploited equilibrium level.

Subspecies list
According to World Register of Marine Species:
Subspecies Diplodus cervinus cervinus (Lowe, 1838)
Subspecies Diplodus cervinus hottentotus (Smith, 1844)
Subspecies Diplodus cervinus omanensis Bauchot & Bianchi, 1984

References

External links
 WORMS
 Fishbase
 

cervinus
Fish of the East Atlantic
Fish of the Mediterranean Sea
Marine fauna of North Africa
Marine fauna of West Africa
Marine fauna of Southern Africa
Fish described in 1838
Taxa named by Richard Thomas Lowe